The  is a Japanese railway line in Gifu Prefecture connecting Ena and Akechi stations, which are both located in Ena. There are stations located in Nakatsugawa city as well. This is the only railway line  operates. The third-sector company took over the former Japanese National Railways line in 1985.

Stations
All stations are located in Gifu Prefecture.
Stations marked "▲" are stopped by the Inbound Rapid service. The Inbound Rapid service runs only on weekdays.
Stations marked "●" are stopped by Express service . The Taishō Roman Gō runs on all days excluding Mondays. It is possible for all passengers who use non-reserved seat to ride on the Taishō Roman Gō without Express Tickets. So, when you ride on the Dining Car, you have to reserve the seats and purchase Express Tickets.

Rolling stock

, the line is operated using a fleet of five Akechi 10 series diesel railcars and one Akechi 6 series diesel railcar.

A new Akechi 100 series diesel railcar (number 101) entered service on 8 April 2017, replacing the former Akechi 6 series car.

History
Freight services were discontinued from 1 February 1981.

See also
List of railway companies in Japan
List of railway lines in Japan

References

External links 

  

Railway lines in Japan
Rail transport in Gifu Prefecture
Railway lines opened in 1933
1067 mm gauge railways in Japan
Japanese third-sector railway lines
1933 establishments in Japan